The surname Breytenbach originates from the Netherlands. Notable people with the name include:

 Anna Breytenbach (born 1968), South African animal activist and public speaker
 Breyten Breytenbach (born 1939), South African writer
 Coenraad Breytenbach (born 1970), South African rugby union and rugby league footballer
 Glynnis Breytenbach (fl. 2014), former prosecutor for the National Prosecuting Authority
 Jan Breytenbach (born 1932), South African Special Forces military officer and author
 Joe Breytenbach (born 1983), South African rugby union player
 Martin  Breytenbach (fl. 2000–2019), South African Anglican bishop
 Nadja Breytenbach (born 1995), Namibian model and Miss Namibia 2019
 Pierre Breytenbach, South African actor and comic

See also
 Breitenbach (disambiguation)

Dutch-language surnames
Afrikaans-language surnames